The 2002 New York Mets season was the 41st regular season for the Mets. They went 75-86 and finished 5th in the NL East. They were managed by Bobby Valentine. They played home games at Shea Stadium.

Offseason
 October 22, 2001: Jorge Velandia was signed as a free agent with the New York Mets.
 December 7, 2001: David Justice was traded by the New York Yankees to the New York Mets for Robin Ventura.
 December 11, 2001: Roberto Alomar was traded by the Cleveland Indians with Danny Peoples (minors) and Mike Bacsik to the New York Mets for players to be named later, Matt Lawton, Alex Escobar, and Jerrod Riggan. The New York Mets sent Earl Snyder (December 13, 2001) and Billy Traber (December 13, 2001) to the Cleveland Indians to complete the trade.
December 13, 2001: Dave Weathers was signed as a free agent with the New York Mets.
 December 14, 2001: David Justice was traded by the New York Mets to the Oakland Athletics for Mark Guthrie and Tyler Yates.
December 16, 2001: Tsuyoshi Shinjo was traded by the New York Mets with Desi Relaford to the San Francisco Giants for Shawn Estes.
January 21, 2002: Alex Ochoa was traded as part of a 3-team trade by the Colorado Rockies to the Milwaukee Brewers. The New York Mets sent Lenny Harris and Glendon Rusch to the Milwaukee Brewers. The New York Mets sent Benny Agbayani, Todd Zeile, and cash to the Colorado Rockies. The Colorado Rockies sent Craig House and Ross Gload to the New York Mets. The Milwaukee Brewers sent Jeff D'Amico, Jeromy Burnitz, Lou Collier, Mark Sweeney, and cash to the New York Mets.
 March 13, 2002: Mark Sweeney was released by the New York Mets.
March 24, 2002: Jason Bay was traded by the Montreal Expos with Jimmy Serrano to the New York Mets for Lou Collier.

Regular season

Opening Day starters
Edgardo Alfonzo
Roberto Alomar
Jeromy Burnitz
Roger Cedeño
Al Leiter
Rey Ordóñez
Jay Payton
Mike Piazza
Mo Vaughn

Season standings

National League East

Record vs. opponents

Notable transactions
April 5, 2002: Marco Scutaro was selected off waivers by the New York Mets from the Milwaukee Brewers.
June 4, 2002: Scott Kazmir was drafted by the New York Mets in the 1st round (15th pick) of the 2002 amateur draft. Player signed August 2, 2002.
July 31, 2002: Jason Bay was traded by the New York Mets with Josh Reynolds (minors) and Bobby Jones to the San Diego Padres for Steve Reed and Jason Middlebrook.

Roster

Player stats

Batting

Starters by position
Note: Pos = Position; G = Games played; AB = At bats; H = Hits; Avg. = Batting average; HR = Home runs; RBI = Runs batted in

Other batters
Note: G = Games played; AB = At bats; H = Hits; Avg. = Batting average; HR = Home runs; RBI = Runs batted in

Pitching

Starting pitchers
Note: G = Games pitched; IP = Innings pitched; W = Wins; L = Losses; ERA = Earned run average; SO = Strikeouts

Other pitchers
Note: G = Games pitched; IP = Innings pitched; W = Wins; L = Losses; ERA = Earned run average; SO = Strikeouts

Relief pitchers
Note: G = Games pitched; W = Wins; L = Losses; SV = Saves; ERA = Earned run average; SO = Strikeouts

Farm system

References

External links
2002 New York Mets at Baseball Reference
2002 New York Mets team page at www.baseball-almanac.com

New York Mets seasons
New York Mets
New York Mets
2000s in Queens